Macrophthalmus crassipes is a species of sentinel crab in the family Macrophthalmidae, found around China, Thailand, Malaysia, Australia, and the Caroline Islands. In Australia it is found from north Western Australia through to New South Wales. Common names include the seagrass sentinel crab and the orange spined sentinel crab. On adult males there is a substantial tooth on the lower claw and a much smaller tooth on the upper claw, and noticeable orange spines on the “wrist” (carpus) of the clawed leg and on the palm of the clawed leg. It is a burrowing crab, and lives in open tidal flats, muddy or with sandy mud, low on tidal creek banks, and adjacent mangroves.

References

External links 

 Video of Macrophthalmus crassipes on YouTube

Ocypodoidea
Crustaceans described in 1852